The 1991 Indian general election in Haryana, occurred for 10 seats in the state.

List of Elected MPs

1991 Indian general election
Indian general elections in Haryana
1990s in Haryana